This is a list of footballers notable for their contributions to East Stirlingshire,  from the formation of the club in 1881 to present. It generally includes only players who made more than 100 league appearances for the club, but some players with fewer than 100 appearances are also included. This includes players who represented their national team while with the club, and players who have set a club record, such as most appearances, most goals or biggest transfer fee.

Some of the players listed made few or no league appearances for East Stirlingshire, due to their playing for the club before it entered the Scottish Football League in 1900.

Notable players 

Bold type indicates that the player currently plays for the club.

Key to positions
 GK — Goalkeeper
 DF — Defender
 MF — Midfielder
 FW — Forward

Notes

References

External links 

 
East Stirlingshire
Association football player non-biographical articles
Players
Players